Bulbophyllum sagemuelleri is a species of orchid in the genus Bulbophyllum  endemic to Negros Occidental, Philippines. It is named after Reinhard Sagemüller, father of Filipino Orchid Enthusiast Josef Sagemüller. It is placed in section Epicranthes (which includes the former genus Epicranthes).

References

 The Bulbophyllum-Checklist
 The Internet Orchid Species Photo Encyclopedia
 Raab Bustamante and Maximilian Kindler (2015) Die Orchidee (Hamburg) 66: 370.
 http://apps.kew.org/wcsp/namedetail.do?name_id=496321

External links
 
 

sagemuellerii
Taxa named by Rene Alfred Anton Bustamante